Savvas Morgan (born 3 December 1988), known professionally as Vas J Morgan, is an English television personality, magazine editor and activist. He is known as a former cast member of the ITVBe BAFTA Award winning reality series The Only Way Is Essex.

Career

Magazine editor
Morgan started his career as a blogger, and in 2010, he launched a celebrity gossip website, which ran for 7 years until he closed it down to focus on his fashion magazine, Tings. The first issue came out in 2017 and had Sofia Richie on its cover.

Television 
In 2014, Morgan joined the cast of The Only Way Is Essex, an ITVBe reality television series. Morgan left the series at the end of the 19th series, and made a guest appearance during the 21st series.

In August 2018, Morgan participated in the fifth series of E4 dating series Celebs Go Dating.

Activism

In March 2020, Morgan launched the WE MATTER platform to allow a safe space for people to discuss mental health issues without judgement and stigma. 

Following the murder of George Floyd, Morgan used his platform to raise over £50,000 to provide free mental health support to black communities.

Personal life
Morgan is from London, England. He has an older brother and two older sisters. Morgan currently lives in Essex, England.

Filmography

References

External links
 

Living people
1988 births
English magazine editors
Television personalities from London